Pritchardia napaliensis is a species of palm tree that is endemic to the island of Kauai in Hawaii, United States. It inhabits gulch slopes in coastal mesic forests on the Nā Pali coastline, especially in the vicinity of Hooluu Valley.

References

napaliensis
Plants described in 1981
Trees of Hawaii
Endemic flora of Hawaii
Critically endangered plants
Biota of Kauai
Taxonomy articles created by Polbot